Goshen County is a county in the U.S. state of Wyoming. As of the 2020 United States Census, the population was 12,498. Its county seat is Torrington. The eastern boundary of the County borders the Nebraska state line.

Goshen County produces more cattle than any other Wyoming county. In 1997, the county had a total of 688 farms and ranches, averaging 1,840 acres. As of 2007, this had declined slightly to 665 farms and ranches in the county.

History

Goshen County was created in 1911 from a portion of Laramie County. Its government was organized in 1913. This area was part of territories, at one time or another, claimed by: Spain, France, Great Britain, Mexico, and the Republic of Texas. The Louisiana Purchase in 1803 permanently established the claim of the United States to the area.

By the 1820s, the North Platte River had become a route for westward-bound fur traders and trappers. By the 1840s this route became part of the Oregon Trail or Mormon Trail. By the late 1850s, it was the route for regularly scheduled east-west stagecoaches carrying passengers and the U.S. mail, and for the short-lived Pony Express carrying mail from Missouri to California (April 1860 to November 1861). By October 1861, transcontinental telegraph lines had been completed along the route. From September 1876 to February 1887, a north-south, Cheyenne-Deadwood stage coach line ran through the County from Cheyenne to the gold fields of the Dakota Territory.

The county was apparently named for Goshen Hole, a valley in the southwest part of the county. John C. Frémont camped in that area on July 14, 1843, and recorded that name in his  journal, during an expedition on the Oregon Trail. At least four conflicting stories are available for the origin of the name "Goshen Hole". The Land of Goshen in Egypt, mentioned in the 45th chapter of the Genesis in the Bible, has been suggested as the most likely. And, John Hunton, who was ranching in the area by the 1870s, was told by Seth Ward, the post sutler at Fort Laramie, that the area was named for the Biblical land. The name of Goshen Hole first appeared on a map years later, in 1888.

Geography
The County is situated in the High Plains east of the Rocky Mountains.

Adjacent counties

 Niobrara County - north
 Platte County - west
 Laramie County - south
 Banner County, Nebraska - southeast
 Scotts Bluff County, Nebraska - east
 Sioux County, Nebraska - east

National protected area
 Fort Laramie National Historic Site

Climate

Situated on the North Platte River, Goshen County has a semi-arid climate (Köppen climate classification BSk.)

On June 5, 2009, a weather research team known as VORTEX2 observed and measured the full life cycle of a tornado in eastern Goshen County.

Demographics

2000 census
As of the 2000 United States Census, of 2000, there were 12,538 people, 5,061 households, and 3,426 families in the county. The population density was 6 people per square mile (2/km2). There were 5,881 housing units at an average density of 3 per square mile (1/km2). The racial makeup of the county was 93.83% White, 0.20% Black or African American, 0.86% Native American, 0.20% Asian, 0.12% Pacific Islander, 3.65% from other races, and 1.14% from two or more races. 8.83% of the population were Hispanic or Latino of any race. 38.2% were of German, 10.4% English, 8.0% American and 8.0% Irish ancestry.

There were 5,061 households, out of which 28.60% had children under the age of 18 living with them, 56.70% were married couples living together, 7.70% had a female householder with no husband present, and 32.30% were non-families. 27.60% of all households were made up of individuals, and 13.10% had someone living alone who was 65 years of age or older.  The average household size was 2.38 and the average family size was 2.90.

The county population contained 24.20% under the age of 18, 9.40% from 18 to 24, 24.30% from 25 to 44, 24.80% from 45 to 64, and 17.30% who were 65 years of age or older. The median age was 40 years. For every 100 females there were 98.90 males. For every 100 females age 18 and over, there were 95.00 males.

The median income for a household in the county was $32,228, and the median income for a family was $40,297. Males had a median income of $27,713 versus $17,584 for females. The per capita income for the county was $15,965. About 9.70% of families and 13.90% of the population were below the poverty line, including 16.30% of those under age 18 and 12.50% of those age 65 or over.

2010 census
As of the 2010 United States Census, there were 13,249 people, 5,311 households, and 3,466 families in the county. The racial makeup of the county was 94.5% white, 0.8% American Indian, 0.6% black or African American, 0.3% Asian, 0.1% Pacific islander, 2.4% from other races, and 1.2% from two or more races. Those of Hispanic or Latino origin made up 9.7% of the population. In terms of ancestry, 38.3% were German, 15.5% were Irish, 15.3% were English, and 5.1% were American.

Of the 5,311 households, 26.4% had children under the age of 18 living with them, 53.1% were married couples living together, 7.9% had a female householder with no husband present, 34.7% were non-families, and 30.0% of all households were made up of individuals. The average household size was 2.29 and the average family size was 2.82. The median age was 43.6 years.

The median income for a household in the county was $42,590 and the median income for a family was $51,978. Males had a median income of $38,247 versus $25,277 for females. The per capita income for the county was $23,753. About 7.2% of families and 13.1% of the population were below the poverty line, including 21.3% of those under age 18 and 5.9% of those age 65 or over.

Communities

City
 Torrington (county seat)

Towns
 Fort Laramie
 La Grange
 Lingle
 Yoder

Census-designated places
 Hawk Springs
 Huntley
 Veteran

Unincorporated communities
 Jay Em
 Rockeagle

Government and infrastructure
The Goshen County Fairgrounds are west of Torrington on U.S. Hwy 26/85. The fairground facilities host many events throughout the year, including an annual Goshen County Fair and numerous rodeo events.

The Wyoming Department of Corrections Wyoming Medium Correctional Institution (WMCI) is located east of Torrington on County Road 72 (Sheep Creek Rd.) The WMCI, a facility of the Wyoming Department of Corrections, serves as an intake center for men not serving death sentences. The grand opening occurred on January 6, 2010.

Goshen County voters have been reliably Republican for several decades. Since 1936, in only one national election did they select the Democratic Party candidate (as of 2020).

Transportation

Highways

U.S. Highways

State Routes

  (Huntley Road)
 (LaGrange Road)
 (Yoder Road)
 (Springer Reservoir Road)
 (Veteran Road)
 (Sugar Factory Road)
 (Horse Creek Road)
 (Van Tassell Road)
 (Old Fort Laramie Road)
 (Yoder-Huntley Road)
 (Chugwater Road)

Airport
 Torrington Municipal Airport (TOR) – Torrington

See also

National Register of Historic Places listings in Goshen County, Wyoming
Wyoming
List of cities and towns in Wyoming
List of counties in Wyoming
Wyoming statistical areas

External links
 Goshen County Sheriff's Office

References

 
1913 establishments in Wyoming
Populated places established in 1913